The Finland national rugby union team represents Finland in men's international rugby union. The team is currently competing in the 2021/22 Rugby Europe Conference 2 North Division.

The national side are ranked 78th in the world, as of 16 January 2023.

History
Finland played their first ever rugby international in 1982 against Switzerland, which they lost. Finland went on to win their first international in 1991, defeating Norway 18 points to 3

They played Monaco in 2002. Finland's attempt to qualify for the 2007 Rugby World Cup in France began in Round 1 of the European tournaments. They faced Bulgaria in a two match series as part of the Round 1 group to determine which nation would advance. Bulgaria won the first game 42 points to 3 in Helsinki and won the second leg 50 to 3 in Sofia to knock Finland out of the tournament.

Record

Current squad
 This was the list of players called to represent Finland in the Rugby Europe Conference 2 North 2021/22 Division

 Coach: Alastair Davies
 Physio: Riikka Nortia
 Team Manager: Luca Seale

2018-19 Squad
 This was the list of players called to represent Finland in the 2018–19 Rugby Europe Conference 2

 Coach: Alastair Davies
 Assistant Coach: David O'Connor
 Physio: Riikka Nortia
 Team Manager: Samuel Kuutti

References

External links
  on RugbyEurope.eu
  Rugby Finland
 Finland  on RugbyData.com

National sports teams of Finland
European national rugby union teams
Teams in European Nations Cup (rugby union)
Rugby union in Finland